Karabulak (Ka rabulak; also as Halabulake) is a township of Akqi County in Xinjiang Uygur Autonomous Region, China. Located in the west of the county, it covers an area of 2,811 kilometres with a population of 7,361 (2010 Census), the main ethnic group is Kyrgyz. The township has 7 administrative villages (as of 2018) and 13 unincorporated villages under jurisdiction, its seat is at Karabulak Village.

The name of Ka Rabulak was from the Kyrgyz language, meaning  clear spring. The township is located in the west of the county, 84 kilometers west of the county seat Akqi Town.

History
It was formerly part of the 2nd district in 1950 and the 3rd district in 1954, Karabulak Commune was established in 1962, and renamed to Weidong Commune, Karabulak Commune in 1978. It was organized as a township in 1984.

Administrative divisions
 Karabulak Village
 Markaq Village
 Akongkur Village
 Akebaxiate Village
 Kailitebieke Village
 Bozitala Village
 Kuersayi Village

Overview
The township is located in the west of the county, the upper reaches of Taushgan River. The main industries in the township are mainly animal husbandry and agriculture. There are 70,000 livestock in stock all year round in the township, the main crops are highland barley, barley, hemp, rapeseed and so on. In the west, there is the site of the ancient Barergendi Fort. There are roads link to Karaqi Township.

References 

Township-level divisions of Akqi County